Rashtraudha Kavya is a laudatory text written during the time of king Narayana of Mayuragiri (Baglana) in Maharashtra, a ruler of Bagul or Rashtraudha lineage. It was composed by poet Rudrakavi in 1596.

References

 Rudrakavi's Great Poem of the Dynasty of Rashtraudha,  J. L. De Bruyne (Translator), Brill Academic Pub (August 1997).

External links
 History of Baglana

Sanskrit texts
Cultural history of Maharashtra